HLD may refer to:

Transport 
 Hellifield railway station, in England
 Hoek van Holland Haven railway station, in the Netherlands
 Holdrege (Amtrak station), in Nebraska, United States
 Hulunbuir Hailar Airport, in China

Other uses 
 Dresden High Magnetic Field Laboratory
 Duan language, spoken in Laos and Vietnam
 Henderson Land Development, a Hong Kong property developer
 Heavy-Light Decomposition
 High-level design
 Highland (council area), in Scotland, Chapman code
 Hold (baseball)
 Homeland defense
 Hyper Light Drifter
 Hyperlipidemia